Brendan Macken (born 19 May 1991) is an Irish former professional rugby player.

Macken, who played Leinster Schools Cup rugby with Blackrock College, made his Leinster senior debut in an away defeat to Glasgow Warriors in the closing weeks on the 2009/10 season.

Having impressed with the Leinster Academy and with the 'A' side in interprovincial and British & Irish Cup matches, Macken found himself limited to a solitary Magners League match, against Aironi, the following season.

With centres Brian O'Driscoll, Gordon D'Arcy and Fergus McFadden in New Zealand on World Cup duty with Ireland, the 21-year-old was given the opportunity and he scored a try, and contributed to another, in the 31–10 defeat of Newport Gwent Dragons. His partnership with Eoin O'Malley in the centre gave Blues supporters and exciting glimpse of the future.

The returning Irish internationals made it tough for Macken to hold down a regular spot but he set about delivering for the 'A' side in clashes against London Welsh and Pontypridd. Macken, capped 13 times by Ireland Under-20s, eventually reached the semi-finals of the 'British & Irish Cup,' before the team were eliminated by Munster.

He was recalled to the senior squad in January and February 2012 for three starts in the PRO12 and scored his second ever league try in a comprehensive 54–13 win over Edinburgh at the RDS. He featured in pre-season games in August and scored a last-minute try against Dragons in a bonus point victory.

On 28 February 2015, Macken signed a loan deal to join Gloucester Rugby until the end of the 2014–15 season. On 22 May 2015, Macken signed a permanent deal to join Aviva Premiership rivals Wasps.

On 28 August 2018 it was confirmed Brendan Macken had left Wasps to join then Championship side London Irish.

References

External links
Leinster Profile

1991 births
Living people
Irish rugby union players
Leinster Rugby players
Gloucester Rugby players
Wasps RFC players
London Irish players
People educated at Blackrock College
Rugby union centres
Rugby union players from Dublin (city)
Irish expatriate sportspeople in England
Expatriate rugby union players in England
Irish expatriate rugby union players